Begoña Huertas Uhagón (1965–2022) was a Spanish writer and journalist. She won the Casa de las Américas Prize for her essay Ensayo de un cambio: la narrativa cubana en la década de los 80.

Biography 
Begoña Huertas was born on 4 August 1965 in Gijón. She completed her doctorate in Spanish philology at the Autonomous University of Madrid, specializing in Latin American literature. Huertas was a visiting lecturer at University of Michigan, then continued as a research fellow at the University of Barcelona.

Huertas worked as an editor at various publishing houses and also taught creative writing at the Autonomous University of Madrid. She wrote for Spanish cultural magazines and in 2010–2012 wrote opinion pieces for the Público, later becoming a columnist for ElDiario.es.

In 1993, Huertas won the Casa de las Américas Prize for the essay Ensayo de un cambio: la narrativa cubana en la década de los 80. She then published a short story collection called A tragos (1996) and continued writing fiction with a number of novels, such as Una noche en Amalfi which was compared by RTVE to the works of Patricia Highsmith. Her last novel, El sótano, was published posthumously by Editorial Anagrama in 2023. Writing for El País,  called it a "beautiful testament", while  described it in El Mundo as a "wonderful invitation to reflect on the uncertainty of life and writing". 

Huertas died on 25 December 2022, in Madrid.

Works

Essays 

 Ensayo de un cambio: la narrativa cubana en la década de los 80, 1994

Short story collections 

 A tragos, 1996

Novels 

 Déjenme dormir en paz, 1998
 Por eso envejecemos tan deprisa, 2001
 En el fondo. Pide una copa paga Proust, 2009
 Una noche en Amalfi, 2012
 El desconcierto, 2017
 El sótano, 2023

References 

1965 births
2022 deaths
20th-century Spanish women writers
21st-century Spanish women writers
20th-century Spanish novelists
21st-century Spanish novelists
Writers from Asturias
Autonomous University of Madrid alumni
Spanish philologists
Spanish women essayists
20th-century Spanish journalists
21st-century Spanish journalists
Spanish women columnists
People from Gijón